4U or 4 U may refer to:

Music
 4U (album), by Elva Hsiao, 2002
 4U (Christina Milian EP), 2015
 4 U (Cody Simpson EP), 2010
 4U: Outside, an EP by BtoB, 2021
 "4U", a song by Aero Chord, 2015
 "4 U", a song by Korn from Issues, 1999
 "4U", a song by Pi'erre Bourne from The Life of Pi'erre 5, 2021

Other uses
 Germanwings (IATA code), an airline
 4U, a rack unit size
 4U, the final (4th) catalog of Uhuru x-ray sources

See also
 U4 (disambiguation)
 For You (disambiguation)